The Rotax Max Challenge Grand Finals (RMC) is a kart racing series owned and organized worldwide by BRP-Powertrain and its distributors, approved and in compliance with CIK-FIA. Competition takes place on a club, national and international level which culminates in the Grand Finals once a year.

Concept
The RMC follows a "one-make-engine" formula: only Rotax Max kart engines are allowed. The success in the competition is mainly up to the skills of the driver and that driver's experience in the set up of the engine and the chassis.

Three race classes are recognized for international competition:

Competition at the national level can include additional classes at the discretion of each national RMC. For example, the US RMC includes the following classes:

Authorised distributors of Rotax kart products offer their customers a national RMC programme according to the “Rotax Sporting and Technical Regulations” defined by BRP-Rotax. This results in a fair competition between kart racers that share the same interests.

National Rotax Max Challenge:
 nearly 7,500 active Rotax MAX drivers in the RMC programme as well as another 7,500 active drivers in race series following the RMC idea.
 competing in around 60 countries on all 5 continents around the globe

International / Continental Rotax Max Challenge competitions:
 Rotax MAX Euro Challenge (over 150 drivers participating)
 Rotax MAX Asia Challenge (Indonesia, Malaysia, Philippines, Thailand, China)
 Rotax MAX US Open

Out of all national as well as continental and international series, drivers qualify for the annual RMC Grand Finals, which is an invitational race. BRP-Powertrain and its partners supply all engines and karts for the event.

RMC Grand Finals
The Grand Finals of the RMC is an international CIK event. Drivers can qualify for the RMC Grand Final via the national Challenge of their home country and the international RMC. The season's winners of each class of all national RMCs and of the international RMC participate free of cost.

The Rotax MAX Challenge Grand Finals is by far the fairest, most international kart sporting event in the world – since all drivers have the same controlled and sealed engines, chassis, tyres and fuel – leaving only the drivers skill to determine the winner of the competition. 
Every year, competitors from around 60 countries, from five continents, can qualify for the annual Grand Finals of the Rotax Max Challenge.

History
The first edition of the Grand Finals took place in 2000 on the island of Puerto Rico with 66 drivers representing 19 countries.

In 2001, finalists were invited to the tropical island of Langkawi in Malaysia. That year, 68 drivers from 29 countries compete for the RMC "world champion" title.

South Africa hosted the Grand Finals in 2002, on a track just outside Pretoria. Drivers from 33 different nations were vying for the gold.

In 2003, the Rotax Max Challenge Grand Finals moved to Egypt. That year, the Junior category was introduced. It was also the company's first time cooperating with a chassis manufacturer in order to supply comparable karts to the competitors. The Junior category raced on a 'single make' chassis supplied by CRG while the seniors raced on their private chassis. This move increased the number of participants to almost 100, representing close to 40 different countries.

The volcanic island of Lanzarote in Spain welcomed the 5th Grand Finals in 2004. That event saw for the first time all competitors racing on supplied 'single make' chassis provided by CRG for the Junior category and by BRP-Rotax for the Senior category. Another milestone was the first use by the senior category of the Rotax RM1 chassis with the new 2-speed shifter engine–the 125 MAX DD2.

The Grand Finals returned to Malaysia in 2005. This time, BRP-Rotax presented an even larger event by running three categories: Junior MAX, Senior MAX and the RM1 shifter (now DD2). The event attracted 140 drivers from 43 nations.

Viana do Castelo in Portugal was the host of the 2006 edition of the RMC Grand Finals and reached a record 186 participants from about 50 countries.

In 2007, the 8th RMC Grand Finals took place at the Al Ain Raceway, a modern and brand new kart racing facility in Al Ain, United Arab Emirates operated by Pro Motorsports / Al Ain Sportplex.

In 2008, the racing event moved to the track of La Conca–Muro Leccese, Italy, with 216 drivers. La Conca is one of the best karting facilities on earth, located 80 km south of Brindisi and close to the city of Otranto in the beautiful region of Apulia.

The 2009 edition took place in December on the desert track of Ghibli Raceway Sharm el-Sheikh, Egypt.

For 2010 the event is heading towards the south of Italy again. At this event the first time 252 drivers will participate as a new category the 125 DD2 MASTERS was added, which is a category for the +32 years old.

2011 was the 12th edition of the Rotax Max Challenge Grand Finals at Al Ain/United Arab Emirates with 265 drivers from over 60 different countries.

2012 Portugal is hosting the Rotax MAX Challenge Grand Finals for the second time. The circuit Portimao Karting Circuit is one of the discipline’s best venues anywhere in the world and also one of the most modern of its kind. 276 drivers participated.

In 2013 the Grand Finals took place in New Orleans/United States and thus it is the first time for the RMCGF to be hosted on American turf. 360 drivers participated in the race.

2014 was the 15th edition of the RMCGF and was hosted in Valencia/Spain. This was the third time that the Grand Finals take place on the Iberian Peninsula after Portugal in 2006 and 2012.

In 2015 the Rotax MAX Challenge Grand Finals (RMCGF) has come to a thrilling and nail-biting end at the Kartódromo Internacional do Algarve, with the United States of America bringing home the Nation’s Cup.

The 17th edition of the Rotax MAX Challenge Grand Finals (RMCGF) will take place at the Circuito Internazionale di Napoli in Sarno, Italy from October 16 to 22, 2016. This event also saw the Micro and Mini classes count as official titles for the first time, having been held as support races for several years, meaning that this edition featured the largest RMCGF entry in its history.

The 2020 edition was originally scheduled to be contested at Sarno, however it was cancelled due to the COVID-19 Pandemic. A replacement race, named the International Trophy, was organised at Portimao.

Winners

References

External links
 Rotax Max Challenge official website
 South African Rotax Max Challenge
 Pictures of the 2008 Rotax Max Challenge 
 United States Rotax Max Challenge official website

Kart racing series